The 1948–49 BAA season was the Lakers' first season in the Basketball Association of America (BAA) (which later became the National Basketball Association (NBA) after the conclusion of this season).

This season saw the Lakers win their first BAA championship, defeating the Washington Capitols in six games in the BAA Finals.

The last remaining active member of the 1948–49 Minneapolis Lakers was center George Mikan, who played his final NBA game in the 1955–56 season, although he missed the 1954–55 season.

Draft

Roster

Regular season

Season standings

x – clinched playoff spot

Record vs. opponents

Game log

Playoffs

|- align="center" bgcolor="#ccffcc"
| 1
| March 23
| Chicago
| W 84–77
| George Mikan (37)
| Minneapolis Auditorium
| 1–0
|- align="center" bgcolor="#ccffcc"
| 2
| March 24
| @ Chicago
| W 101–85
| George Mikan (38)
| Chicago Stadium
| 2–0
|-

|- align="center" bgcolor="#ccffcc"
| 1
| March 27
| @ Rochester
| W 80–79
| George Mikan (32)
| Edgerton Park Arena
| 1–0
|- align="center" bgcolor="#ccffcc"
| 2
| March 29
| Rochester
| W 67–55
| George Mikan (31)
| St. Paul Auditorium
| 2–0
|-

|- align="center" bgcolor="#ccffcc"
| 1
| April 4
| Washington
| W 88–84
| George Mikan (42)
| Minneapolis Auditorium8,210
| 1–0
|- align="center" bgcolor="#ccffcc"
| 2
| April 6
| Washington
| W 76–62
| Don Carlson (16)
| Minneapolis Auditorium10,212
| 2–0
|- align="center" bgcolor="#ccffcc"
| 3
| April 8
| @ Washington
| W 94–74
| George Mikan (35)
| Uline Arena4,919
| 3–0
|- align="center" bgcolor="#ffcccc"
| 4
| April 9
| @ Washington
| L 71–83
| George Mikan (27)
| Uline Arena4,471
| 3–1
|- align="center" bgcolor="#ffcccc"
| 5
| April 11
| @ Washington
| L 65–74
| George Mikan (22)
| Uline Arena3,840
| 3–2
|- align="center" bgcolor="#ccffcc"
| 6
| April 13
| Washington
| W 77–56
| George Mikan (29)
| St. Paul Auditorium10,482
| 4–2
|-

Awards and records
George Mikan, All-BAA First Team
Jim Pollard, All-BAA First Team

References

Los Angeles Lakers seasons
Minneapolis
NBA championship seasons
Minnesota Lakers
Minnesota Lakers